Delhi, Andaman and Nicobar Islands, Lakshadweep, Dadra and Nagar Haveli and Daman and Diu Civil Service is now called Delhi, Andaman, Nicobar Islands, Lakshwadeep, Dadra Nagar Haveli and Daman Diu Administrative Service (DANIAS)  cadre civil servants are recruited directly through the Civil Services Examination and are responsible for the diverse administrative functions of the National Capital Territory of Delhi and the Union territories of India.

General status and selection 
For selection into DANIAS, one has to qualify the Civil Services Exam, which is held annually. The Civil Services Examination has a three-stage competitive selection process. At stage one, there is an objective type examination called the preliminary exam. This is a qualifying examination. It consists of a General Studies paper and an aptitude test. Only the candidates who pass this can appear for the "Main Examination" which consists of nine papers. Each candidate has to select an optional subject (two papers in the form of Paper A and Paper B as per the prescribed syllabus) and to take four General Studies papers, an Essay, an English language paper and a regional language paper. This is followed by an interview.
The cadre is further augmented by promotion of non-gazetted civil service officers. Two thirds of the strength is filled by direct recruitment and the remaining by promotion.

Postings of DANIAS Officers 
Mainly after the training period of two years, DANIAS officers are initially posted as Assistant collector (District Administration, Delhi) or Sub Divisional Magistrate. On deputation in the autonomous Bodies of Delhi like Municipal Corporation of Delhi, North Delhi Municipal Corporation, Delhi District Administration etc. or as Deputy Secretary in different Ministries of Delhi Government. Other than Delhi DANIAS officers are regularly posted to UTs of Daman & Diu, Dadra & Nagar Haveli, Andaman & Nicobar Islands and Lakshdweep Islands. Recently Three DANIAS officers were transferred and posted to UT of Chandigarh thereby increasing the territorial extent of DANICS cadre. Ministry of Home Affairs is considering the inclusion of UT of Ladakh also into DANICS cadre but official notification in this regard has not been issued so far. After attaining seniority, they get promotion into Senior Grades (JAG-I and JAG-II/SAG) and get inducted into the AGMUT cadre of the Indian Administrative Service.

See also

 DANIPS
 Indian State Civil Services
 List of Public service commissions in India

References

Civil Services of India
Civil Service
Civil Service
Civil Service
Civil Service
Civil Service